Laura Spragg (born 16 June 1982) is an English former cricketer who played as a left-arm medium bowler and left-handed batter. She appeared in one Test match and 13 One Day Internationals for England. She also played for England under-23s. She played her sole Test match against South Africa in 2003 and made her One Day International debut against Denmark in 1999. Her best international bowling performance of 3 wickets for 8 runs came against the Netherlands. Her highest international score of 33 came against Scotland in the 2001 European Championship. She played domestic cricket for Yorkshire and also made one appearance for Yorkshire Diamonds in the Women's Cricket Super League.

References

External links
 

1982 births
Living people
People from Keighley
England women Test cricketers
England women One Day International cricketers
Cricketers from Yorkshire
Yorkshire women cricketers
Yorkshire Diamonds cricketers